Kay Elizabeth Bass Saunders   (born 1947) is an Australian historian and Emeritus Professor at the University of Queensland.

Earlyl life and education
Saunders was born in Brisbane, Queensland in 1947. She graduated with a BA (1970) and PhD (1975) from the University of Queensland (UQ).

Career
She was employed by UQ throughout her academic career, firstly as tutor, then progressing through the ranks to Professor of History (2002–2005). Following her retirement in 2006 she was appointed Emeritus Professor.

Honours and recognition 
Saunders was appointed a Member of the Order of Australia in 1999, and was promoted to Officer in the 2021 Australia Day Honours for "distinguished service to tertiary education, particularly to history, as an academic and author, to professional associations, and to the community".

Selected works 
 
  (Reissued in 2020.)

References 

1947 births
Living people
University of Queensland alumni
Academic staff of the University of Queensland
Members of the Order of Australia
Officers of the Order of Australia
Australian women historians